Amphilochus is a genus of crustaceans in the Amphipoda order, containing the following species:

Amphilochus ascidicola Martin, Ortiz & Atienza, 2001
Amphilochus borealis Enequist, 1949
Amphilochus brunneus Della Valle, 1893
Amphilochus casahoya McKinney, 1978
Amphilochus castroviejoi Ortiz & Lalana, 2002
Amphilochus delacaya McKinney, 1978
Amphilochus filidactylus hurley, 1955
Amphilochus justi Azman, 2009
Amphilochus kailua J. L. Barnard, 1970
Amphilochus lacertus Azman, 2009
Amphilochus likelike J. L. Barnard, 1970
Amphilochus litoralis Stout, 1912
Amphilochus manudens Bate, 1862
Amphilochus marionis Stebbing, 1888
Amphilochus menehune J. L. Barnard, 1970
Amphilochus neapolitanus Della Valle, 1893
Amphilochus opunake J. L. Barnard, 1972
Amphilochus picadurus J. L. Barnard, 1962
Amphilochus pillaii Barnard & Thomas, 1983
Amphilochus planierensis Ledoyer, 1977
Amphilochus ruperti Moore, 1988
Amphilochus schubarti Schellenberg, 1938
Amphilochus spencebatei (Stebbing, 1876)
Amphilochus tenuimanus Boeck, 1871
Amphilochus tropicus (Rabindranath, 1972)

References

Gammaridea
Taxa named by Charles Spence Bate
Malacostraca genera